Pedro Lorenzo Alliana Rodríguez (born 19 February 1973) is a Paraguayan politician, currently serving as President of the Chamber of Deputies of Paraguay since 2019 and President of the Colorado Party from 2016 to 2023. He is currently running for vice-president of Paraguay in the 2023 Paraguayan general election.

Early life 

Alliana was born in the city of Pilar, located in Ñeembucú department on 19 February 1974. His parents, Maria Nidia Rodriguez and Hector Ruben Alliana Baez, were both departmental councilors of Ñeembucú. He has two brothers; Ana Lucia Alliana Rodriguez and Rodolfo Alliana Rodriguez. He attended primary school at the Cristo Rey Subsidized School and secondary school at the Santo Tomas Italian National College. During his adolescence years he played basketball, and participated in national tournaments. In 1991, he was part of the Paraguay national basketball team. 

Alliana later married Fabiana Maria Souto and has four children.

Political career 
Alliana ran for the Colorado Party as a candidate for mayor of Pilar in 2006. He lost the mayoral election, and instead ran for the governorship of Ñeembucú in 2008. He managed to win the election, becoming governor of Ñeembucú. In 2013 he managed to win a seat in the Chamber of Deputies as a representative of the Department of Ñeembucú. 

Alliana was elected leader of the Colorado Party on 18 April 2016. He served as President of the Chamber of Deputies of Paraguay from 30 June 2017 to 30 June 2018. 

After the 2018 general elections, he was re-elected Deputy for the period 2018-2023. He was subsequently re-elected for a second time on 1 July 2019 as President of the Chamber of Deputies of Paraguay.

References 

Living people
1973 births
Colorado Party (Paraguay) politicians
Presidents of the Chamber of Deputies of Paraguay
21st-century Paraguayan politicians